Novy Aldar (Yañı Aldar) is a rural locality (a village) in Asavdybashsky Selsoviet, Yanaulsky District, Bashkortostan, Russia. The population was 100 as of 2010. There is 1 street.

Geography 
Novy Aldar is located 28 km southeast of Yanaul (the district's administrative centre) by road. Igrovka is the nearest rural locality.

References 

Rural localities in Yanaulsky District